Branko Radovanović (born 18 February 1981) is a former Serbian footballer.

Career
He most recently played for UTA Arad in the Romanian Liga I. He also played for a number of clubs, as Serbian FK Čukarički, FK Beograd, FK Železnik and FK Radnički Beograd, South Korean, K League clubs Pusan Daewoo Royals, Greek club Kallithea, an unsuccessful experiencies with Austrian FC Red Bull Salzburg, Russian FC Amkar Perm and Polish Wisła Kraków.

References

External links
 
 Profile at Playerhistory

1981 births
Living people
Serbia and Montenegro footballers
Serbian footballers
Association football forwards
Serbian expatriate footballers
Serbia and Montenegro expatriate footballers
Expatriate footballers in South Korea
Expatriate footballers in Austria
Expatriate footballers in Russia
Expatriate footballers in Greece
Expatriate footballers in Poland
Expatriate footballers in Romania
Serbian expatriate sportspeople in South Korea
Serbian expatriate sportspeople in Poland
K League 1 players
Ekstraklasa players
Liga I players
FK Čukarički players
Busan IPark players
Jeonbuk Hyundai Motors players
FK Zemun players
FK Beograd players
FC Red Bull Salzburg players
FK Železnik players
FK Radnički Beograd players
FC Amkar Perm players
Kallithea F.C. players
Wisła Kraków players
FC UTA Arad players